is a manhwa by Kim Young-oh. It was first published on September 20, 2006 becoming a huge success in Korea becoming one of the top 10 selling titles in the country and is now published by Dark Horse Comics in the United States.

Outline
Aimed at the age group mainly for 16 and over, the series follows the adventures of the main character Banya, a feisty teenage delivery man with a reputation for being unstoppable. Banya is characterised as being loyal to no-one: to no religion or country, but only to the motto of the Gaya Desert Post Office: "Fast. Precise. Secure." which is the thrust of his delivery work and sets the tone of the action. His apolitical position generally creates the conflict and tension driving the stories. For example, in Volume 3, he "finds himself in the middle of a mysterious dispute at the heart of a sacred temple – trapped between devout warrior-priests" and the vicious, ruthless opponents called the "Torren".

A cross between Dune, Mad Max, and The Lord of the Rings, Banya combines the post-apocalyptic aesthetic with science fiction, action and fantasy genres. From the outset it engages in a desert battle between human soldiers and a horde of Tolkien-esque monsters called Torren. Out of this chaos a lone figure emerges: a brash young mail carrier named Banya who continually outwits the Torren. As the "Postman of the Wastleland" he likes to be paid. and is generally in flat pursuit of his goal, with his own set of rules.

Plot introduction

With a widespread war raging between humans and the monstrous Torren, the young delivery men of the Gaya Desert Post Office do not pledge allegiance to any country or king. They are banded together by the pledge to deliver "Fast. Precise. Secure." Throughout a variety of missions and adventures in the face of overwhelming odds, it is Banya's ingenuity, flexibility and resourcefulness that carries them to successful outcomes.

Characters

Main characters
Banya: Is the main character. In the shōnen style of the savvy boy hero, he is scruffy, wild and a known risk taker, proudly asserting, "There isn't a delivery I can't make!" while the story is told from his point of view.

Mei: Is a female delivery girl and supplies the team's conscience. She knows Banya from a long time ago. In the manhwa it is not clear when exactly but shows her meeting Banya when she was much younger.

Kong: Is the younger delivery boy and Baya's cohort. As a foil for the main character, he is shown to be naive and sometimes arrogant. The source of his confidence is Banya.

Minor characters
Mister: Appearing in Volume 1 and 2, this character's name is not revealed but always referred to as Mister in the manhwa. Mister is a young male soldier found injured in the desert. He was to deliver a scroll to save Gaya, but failed, so Banya takes up the mission. As Banya leaves, the men following Mister find him. With Kong and Mei he tries to fend the men off, but dies in the end.

Jiahn : This character has been imprisoned at a shrine for an unspecified period of time and is released from prison after receiving the scroll Banya promised to deliver, as shown in Chapter 17 of Volume 3.  When introduced, Jiahn is in a robed outfit and appears male, but after defeating enemies attacking the prison, the robe is damaged and Jiahn is revealed to be female.

Torren
The Torren is a fearsome army, who had been fighting with the shrine for years. The Torren had the advantage for many of those years. Their armor was made completely of leather except for the armored chest piece that goes right above their chest. The leather suit of armor they wear consist of leather shorts and leather straps going across the body. Others wore what appeared to be a leather halter top. The Torren are large and bulky. They look monstrous and not human. They were destroyed in Chapter 17 Volume 3.

Production and background
Kim Young-oh's fast-paced action stories of Banya include amusing moments. The comics series is presented in Korean format translated into English by the mother/son team of Taesoon Kang and Derek Kirk Kim and produced by Dark Horse Comics in the United States. Lettering is by Steve Outro.

One reviewer observed that the art is in two styles, one "is the more polished and detailed 'epic' style, like the material in the opening battle and on the cover", and the other more casual for the comedy situations.

There are currently five volumes of Banya: The Explosive Delivery Man. All have been published in English by Dark Horse Manhwa.

Volume list

References

External links
 
 Banya: The Explosive Delivery Man (manhwa) at Dark Horse Comics

Action-adventure comics
Haksan Culture Company titles
Tokyopop titles